Atlantic station may refer to:
 Atlantic station (Los Angeles Metro), a light rail station in Los Angeles
 Atlantic station (Staten Island Railway), a former rapid transit station in New York City
 Atlantic Station, Atlanta neighborhood
 Atlantic Street station, light-rail station in Newark, New Jersey

See also 
 Atlantic Avenue (disambiguation)